GCIRS 8* (Galactic Centre IRS 8*) is a young massive star in the Galactic Center region, discovered in May 2006. IRS 8 is an infra-red source identified as a bowshock. The star causing the bowshock has been classified as an O5-O6 giant or supergiant several hundred thousand times as luminous as the sun. It is estimated to be 3.5 million years old, although if it is a binary then it would probably be older.

References

O-type supergiants
Sagittarius (constellation)
20060531